No Tears for the Creatures is the third and final studio album from UK metalcore band, Johnny Truant.

Track listing

 The Grotesque - 3:54 
 Death Rides - 3:36 
 Last Arms of the Apocalypse - 5:37 
 Widower - 1:49 
 Crush and Devour - 4:03 
 In Alcoholica - 4:52 
 Dead Ships Sinking - 5:46 
 Sunshine Diver - 3:54 
 Fog Lights - 6:43 
 The Weeping, Wailing, and Gnashing of Teeth - 7:05

Credit
Paul Jackson - Drums 
Stuart Hunter - Guitar, vocals 
Alan Booth - Bass guitar 
Reuben Gotto - Guitar 
Olly Mitchell - Vocals
Justin Hill - Producing, Mixing, Engineering
Dan Weller - Producing, Mixing, Engineering
Nick Kinnish - Engineering at Brighton Electric Studios
Wade MacNeil - additional vocals on "Widower"

Johnny Truant albums
2008 albums
Albums produced by Dan Weller